Troy David Chaplin (born 23 February 1986) is a former professional Australian rules footballer who played for the Port Adelaide Football Club and Richmond Football Club in the Australian Football League (AFL). He has served as the offensive coordinator at the Melbourne Football Club since October 2016.

Chaplin played for the Maryborough Rovers Football Club and was drafted by Port Adelaide from North Ballarat Rebels at selection 15 in the 2003 AFL Draft.

The then 18-year-old left footer debuted in 2004 in Round 4 against Melbourne and played eight matches in 2005. He suffered a fractured left eye socket in round one of 2006, but found consistency and collected 20 or more possessions four times that season.

Standing 196 cm tall, Troy was also a champion basketballer and was a member of the Victorian Under 18 basketball team.

He was nominated for the 2006 NAB Rising Star award in Round 16 of that season.

A restricted free agent at the completion of the 2012 season, Chaplin was made a four year offer by the Richmond Football Club, one which Port Adelaide chose not be match.

In July 2016, Chaplin announced his immediate retirement from the AFL.

Statistics

|- style="background-color: #EAEAEA"
! scope="row" style="text-align:center" | 2004
|
| 30 || 1 || 0 || 0 || 2 || 1 || 3 || 3 || 0 || 0.0 || 0.0 || 2.0 || 1.0 || 3.0 || 3.0 || 0.0
|-
! scope="row" style="text-align:center" | 2005
|
| 30 || 8 || 0 || 0 || 55 || 58 || 113 || 40 || 8 || 0.0 || 0.0 || 6.9 || 7.3 || 14.1 || 5.0 || 1.0
|- style="background-color: #EAEAEA"
! scope="row" style="text-align:center" | 2006
|
| 30 || 19 || 2 || 1 || 155 || 133 || 288 || 103 || 24 || 0.1 || 0.1 || 8.2 || 7.0 || 15.2 || 5.4 || 1.3
|-
! scope="row" style="text-align:center" | 2007
|
| 30 || 14 || 3 || 0 || 110 || 136 || 246 || 87 || 22 || 0.2 || 0.0 || 7.9 || 9.7 || 17.6 || 6.2 || 1.6
|- style="background-color: #EAEAEA"
! scope="row" style="text-align:center" | 2008
|
| 30 || 19 || 2 || 1 || 146 || 159 || 305 || 89 || 27 || 0.1 || 0.1 || 7.7 || 8.4 || 16.1 || 4.7 || 1.4
|-
! scope="row" style="text-align:center" | 2009
|
| 30 || 20 || 2 || 1 || 184 || 176 || 360 || 120 || 41 || 0.1 || 0.1 || 9.2 || 8.8 || 18.0 || 6.0 || 2.1
|- style="background-color: #EAEAEA"
! scope="row" style="text-align:center" | 2010
|
| 30 || 20 || 0 || 0 || 240 || 137 || 377 || 108 || 49 || 0.0 || 0.0 || 12.0 || 6.9 || 18.9 || 5.4 || 2.5
|-
! scope="row" style="text-align:center" | 2011
|
| 30 || 21 || 1 || 3 || 204 || 137 || 341 || 115 || 50 || 0.0 || 0.1 || 9.7 || 6.5 || 16.2 || 5.5 || 2.4
|- style="background-color: #EAEAEA"
! scope="row" style="text-align:center" | 2012
|
| 30 || 18 || 0 || 1 || 179 || 96 || 275 || 106 || 37 || 0.0 || 0.1 || 9.9 || 5.3 || 15.3 || 5.9 || 2.1
|-
! scope="row" style="text-align:center" | 2013
|
| 25 || 22 || 1 || 1 || 179 || 129 || 308 || 130 || 35 || 0.0 || 0.0 || 8.1 || 5.9 || 14.0 || 5.9 || 1.6
|- style="background-color: #EAEAEA"
! scope="row" style="text-align:center" | 2014
|
| 25 || 23 || 2 || 1 || 171 || 172 || 343 || 106 || 35 || 0.1 || 0.0 || 7.4 || 7.5 || 14.9 || 4.6 || 1.5
|-
! scope="row" style="text-align:center" | 2015
|
| 25 || 22 || 1 || 0 || 209 || 123 || 332 || 137 || 34 || 0.0 || 0.0 || 9.5 || 5.6 || 15.1 || 6.2 || 1.5
|- style="background-color: #EAEAEA"
! scope="row" style="text-align:center" | 2016
|
| 25 || 8 || 1 || 2 || 62 || 37 || 99 || 36 || 15 || 0.1 || 0.3 || 7.8 || 4.6 || 12.4 || 4.5 || 1.9
|- class="sortbottom"
! colspan=3| Career
! 215
! 15
! 11
! 1896
! 1494
! 3390
! 1180
! 377
! 0.1
! 0.1
! 8.8
! 6.9
! 15.8
! 5.5
! 1.8
|}

References

External links

1986 births
Living people
Australian rules footballers from Victoria (Australia)
Port Adelaide Football Club players
Port Adelaide Football Club players (all competitions)
Richmond Football Club players
Greater Western Victoria Rebels players
Sturt Football Club players